The 1936 U.S. National Championships (now known as the US Open) was a tennis tournament that took place on the outdoor grass courts at the West Side Tennis Club, Forest Hills in New York City, United States. The tournament ran from 3 September until 12 September. It was the 56th staging of the U.S. National Championships and the fourth Grand Slam tennis event of the year.

Fred Perry's victory would remain as the last Grand Slam tournament won by a British man until Andy Murray won the US Open in 2012, 76 years apart.

Finals

Men's singles

 Fred Perry defeated  Don Budge  2–6, 6–2, 8–6, 1–6, 10–8

Women's singles

 Alice Marble defeated  Helen Jacobs  4–6, 6–3, 6–2

Men's doubles
 Don Budge /  Gene Mako defeated  Wilmer Allison /  John Van Ryn 6–4, 6–2, 6–4

Women's doubles
 Carolin Babcock /  Marjorie Gladman Van Ryn defeated  Helen Hull Jacobs /  Sarah Palfrey Cooke 9–7, 2–6, 6–4

Mixed doubles
 Alice Marble /  Gene Mako defeated  Sarah Palfrey Cooke /  Don Budge 6–3, 6–2

References

External links
Official US Open website

 
U.S. National Championships
U.S. National Championships (tennis) by year
U.S. National Championships
U.S. National Championships
U.S. National Championships